Stauranthera is a genus of flowering plants in the family Gesneriaceae, native to Bangladesh, the Nicobar Islands, Assam, the eastern Himalayas, south-central and southeast China (including Hainan), Southeast Asia, and Malesia to New Guinea. It is very close morphologically and genetically to Loxonia.

Species
Currently accepted species include:

Stauranthera argyrescens Hallier f.
Stauranthera coerulea (Blume) Merr.
Stauranthera grandifolia Benth.
Stauranthera ionantha Hallier f.
Stauranthera novoguineensis B.L.Burtt
Stauranthera parvifolia S.Moore
Stauranthera umbrosa (Griff.) C.B.Clarke

References

Gesneriaceae genera
Didymocarpoideae